Shazia Wajahat is a Pakistani television and film producer. The wife of director Wajahat Rauf, best known for producing a number of television series under her production banner Showcase Productions, formerly known as Showcase Communications.

Career 
Wajahat made her debut as a producer and first produced television series Shab-e-Arzoo Ka Aalam for ARY Digital. She then went on to produce some successful television series including Yaar-e-Bewafa (2017), Damsa (2019) and Raqs-e-Bismil (2020).

Film 

 Parde Mein Rehne Do (2022)

Television

Current productions

Former productions

Award and achievements 
Shazia's film Main Kukkoo Aur Woh won the Hum Award for Best Television Film in 2015.

References 

Year of birth missing (living people)
Living people
Pakistani producers
Pakistani directors
21st-century Pakistani women